Rodolfo Vollenweider (5 February 1917 – 27 December 2009) was an Argentine sailor. He competed in the 5.5 Metre event at the 1952 Summer Olympics.

References

External links
 

1917 births
2009 deaths
Argentine male sailors (sport)
Olympic sailors of Argentina
Sailors at the 1952 Summer Olympics – 5.5 Metre
Sportspeople from Buenos Aires